The Lithuanian German Committee (LVK) was a political party in inter-war Lithuania.

History
The LVK contested the first parliamentary elections in Lithuania in 1920, receiving 1.1% of the vote and winning a single seat. The 1922 elections saw the party lose its seat, and it did not contest any further elections.

References

Defunct political parties in Lithuania
Political parties in the Memel Territory